Northrup may refer to:

People

Given name 
 Northrup R. Knox (1928–1998), banker in Buffalo, New York

Surname 
 Christiane Northrup (born 1949), Obstetrician-gynecologist who promotes anti vaccine and medical pseudoscience
 Samuel Northrup (1801–1860), member of the Wisconsin State Assembly
 William Barton Northrup (1856–1925), Canadian lawyer and politician
 Edwin Fitch Northrup (1866–1940), professor of physics at Princeton University
 Theodore Havermeyer Northrup (1866–1919), American ragtime composer
 Harry Northrup (1875–1936), French-American film actor of the silent film era
 Phil Northrup (1898–1973), American track and field athlete
 Leonard L. Northrup Jr. (1918–2016), American inventor and businessman
 Sara Northrup Hollister (1924–1997), American involved in the early formation of Dianetics
 Jim Northrup (baseball) (1939–2011), nicknamed the “Gray Fox”, a former Major League Baseball player, mostly as a member of the Detroit Tigers
 Jim Northrup (writer) (born 1943), Anishinaabe (Native American) newspaper columnist, poet, performer and political commentator
 Bruce Northrup (born 1955), politician in New Brunswick, Canada
 David Northrup (born 1961), American politician 
 Tony Northrup (born 1974), American author, photographer, and video instructor
 Patricia Northrup, American military pilot and a former Miss California

Places
 Northrup-Gilbert House, a historic home located at Phoenix in Oswego County, New York
 Northrup Hill School District 10, a historic one-room school building located at Rathbone in Steuben County, New York
 Palmer-Northrup House, an historic site at 7919 Post Road in North Kingstown, Rhode Island

Other
 Northrup-King, an agricultural seed company in Minnesota
 Northrup & O'Brien, an American architectural firm that lasted from 1916 to 1953

See also  
 Solomon Northup (1808–?), violinist abducted and sold as a slave, later an abolitionist writer
 Stephen Northup House, a historic house at 99 Featherbed Lane in North Kingstown, Rhode Island
 Anson Northup, a riverboat that offers tours in the Mississippi Twin Cities area
 Northrop (disambiguation)  
 Northrop Corporation, United States aircraft manufacturer
 Northrop Grumman, American global aerospace and defense technology company